E Is for Edie is an upcoming American comedy television series created by Jeanie Bergen that is set to premiere on Charter Communications' Spectrum cable service under their Spectrum Originals video on demand service.

Premise
E Is for Edie begins "when a single woman becomes the sole caregiver to her disabled sister."

Production
On August 30, 2018, it was announced that Charter Communications had greenlit a dark comedy series created by Jeanie Bergen that they planned to release through their Spectrum cable service. Executive producers were expected to include Bergen, Kate Robbin, Brittany Cope, and Jonathan Stern. Production companies involved with the series were slated to consist of Abominable Pictures.

References

English-language television shows
Upcoming comedy television series
Spectrum Originals original programming